Lachhiman Gurung  (30 December 1917 – 12 December 2010) was a Nepalese–British Gurkha recipient of the Victoria Cross, the highest and most prestigious award for gallantry in the face of the enemy that can be awarded to British and Commonwealth forces. He is best known as the "Gurkha who took on 200 soldiers with only one hand" because of his actions in World War II.

Birth and army service
Gurung was born on 30 December 1917, in the village of Dahakhani VDC (Now also called Ichchhakamana Rural Municipality), Chitwan District of Nepal, the son of Partiman Gurung. He joined the British Indian Army in December 1940, permitted to enlist in wartime although he was only 4'11" (1.5m) tall and so below the peacetime minimum height. He was 27 years old, and a rifleman in the 4th Battalion, 8th Gurkha Rifles, in the Indian Army during World War II when the following deed took place in May 1945 for which he was awarded the VC.

His Battalion was part of the 89th Indian Infantry Brigade of 7th Indian Infantry Division, which was ordered to cross the Irrawaddy River and attack Japanese forces to the north of the road from Prome to Taungup.  The Japanese withdrew towards Taungdaw, where Gurung was part of the two companies of the 4th Battalion, 8th Gurkha Rifles, waiting when the Japanese attacked in force in the early morning.

On 12/13 May 1945 at Taungdaw, Burma [now Myanmar], Rifleman Lachhiman Gurung was manning the most forward post of his platoon which bore the brunt of an attack by at least 200 of the Japanese enemy. He hurled back two hand grenades which had fallen on his trench, but the third exploded in his right hand after he attempted to throw it back, blowing off his fingers, shattering his arm and severely wounding him in the face, body and right leg. His two comrades were also badly wounded but the rifleman, now alone and disregarding his wounds, loaded and fired his rifle with his left hand for four hours (all while he screamed "Come and fight a Gurkha!"), calmly waiting for each attack which he met with fire at point blank range.

His citation in the London Gazette ends with...

He received his Victoria Cross from the Viceroy of India, Field Marshal Lord Wavell at the Red Fort in Delhi on 19 December 1945.

Further information and later life

Gurung was hospitalised for the wounds he received during the above action and subsequently lost his right eye and the use of his right hand, but he continued to serve with the 8th Gurkhas, choosing to remain with them when they were transferred to the newly independent Indian Army in 1947. He later achieved the rank of Hon. Havildar and he returned to his village in Nepal on completion of his service in 1947, where he farmed on a small holding.

He married twice; having two sons and daughter from his first marriage, and two more sons from his second. One of his sons later became an officer in the 8th Gurkha Rifles.

A new house was provided for him and his family in 1995 near the Gurkha Welfare Centre at Chitwan, using a donation of £2,000 from Armourers and Brasiers Company. Later in 1995, he received a cheque for £100,500 from the Gurkha Welfare Trust, presented by British Prime Minister John Major at 10 Downing Street. £8,000 was also awarded to him by the Indian Army as a loan for his Victoria Cross medal, which he gave to them as an inspiration for young servicemen.

In 2008, Gurung and Honorary Lieutenant Tul Bahadur Pun VC were two of the five claimants in a legal claim to allow Gurkha servicemen who had retired before July 1997 (when the Gurkha base moved from Hong Kong to the UK) to settle in the UK.  The High Court ordered the government to review its policy, and Gurung was allowed to settle in Hounslow, where he was looked after by his granddaughter, Amrita.

Gurung was admitted to the Charing Cross Hospital on 19 November after his health condition worsened, suffering from pneumonia. Gurung died on 12 December 2010. He was survived by his second wife, Manmaya, and his five children.

His funeral was held on Wednesday 22 December 2010 at Hounslow Civic Centre, Lampton Road, Hounslow, Middlesex, TW3 4DN.

The medal
The medal is currently held in India, in the possession of Gurung's parent unit, the 4th Battalion, 8th Gurkha Rifles.

See also
 List of Brigade of Gurkhas recipients of the Victoria Cross

References

Bibliography

External links
Lachiman Gurung 

1917 births
2010 deaths
British Indian Army soldiers
Gurkhas
Nepalese World War II recipients of the Victoria Cross
Nepalese people of World War II
Nepalese recipients of the Victoria Cross
Nepalese emigrants to the United Kingdom
Nepalese Buddhists
Nepalese people
People from Chitwan District
Gurung people